Rink Glacier is a glacier in Avannaata, Greenland. 

This glacier is named in honor of Hinrich Johannes Rink, Danish geologist and Greenlandic researcher.

Geography
The Rink Glacier is the largest glacier on the west coast of Greenland. Its terminus is in the Karrat Fjord, Nordost Bay, Baffin Bay, North Atlantic Ocean.

As reported by Anker Weidick and Ole Bennike in 2007, it is ranked second or third in iceberg production in western Greenland. It is also the swiftest moving and highest surface ice in the world.

See also
List of glaciers in Greenland

References

Glaciers of Greenland